Viaduct Harbour, formerly known as Viaduct Basin, is a former commercial harbour on the Auckland waterfront that has been turned into a development of mostly upscale apartments, office space and restaurants. It is located on the site of a formerly run-down area of the Freemans Bay / Auckland CBD waterfront in Auckland, New Zealand. As a centre of activity of the 2000 America's Cup hosted by the Royal New Zealand Yacht Squadron, as well as the 2022 Rally New Zealand, the precinct enjoyed considerable popularity with locals and foreign visitors.

Demographics

Wynyard-Viaduct had a population of 1,008 at the 2018 New Zealand census, an increase of 33 people (3.4%) since the 2013 census, and an increase of 309 people (44.2%) since the 2006 census. There were 630 households, comprising 516 males and 492 females, giving a sex ratio of 1.05 males per female. The median age was 44.4 years (compared with 37.4 years nationally), with 39 people (3.9%) aged under 15 years, 189 (18.8%) aged 15 to 29, 648 (64.3%) aged 30 to 64, and 129 (12.8%) aged 65 or older.

Ethnicities were 75.3% European/Pākehā, 3.6% Māori, 1.8% Pacific peoples, 18.8% Asian, and 6.5% other ethnicities. People may identify with more than one ethnicity.

The percentage of people born overseas was 53.0, compared with 27.1% nationally.

Although some people chose not to answer the census's question about religious affiliation, 57.4% had no religion, 30.4% were Christian, 0.9% were Hindu, 1.8% were Muslim, 1.8% were Buddhist and 3.9% had other religions.

Of those at least 15 years old, 495 (51.1%) people had a bachelor's or higher degree, and 33 (3.4%) people had no formal qualifications. The median income was $74,000, compared with $31,800 nationally. 507 people (52.3%) earned over $70,000 compared to 17.2% nationally. The employment status of those at least 15 was that 645 (66.6%) people were employed full-time, 99 (10.2%) were part-time, and 27 (2.8%) were unemployed.

History

Original purpose

Designed along the line of the basins common in London, the Viaduct Basin was so-called because of a failed scheme by the Auckland Harbour Board in the early years of the 20th century. As the size of ships was increasing dramatically, rather than build new wharves or dredge the harbour channels, it was proposed that cargo ships moor out in the Waitematā Harbour channel and be unloaded into "lighters", small barges that would then ferry the goods to shore via the specially built wharves in the new "Viaduct Lighter Basin". The shipping companies refused to co-operate and forced the Harbour Board to engage in dredging and the construction of new wharves.

This left the partially completed lighter basin without a real purpose, so it was used to berth the various fishing boats and thus tidy up the appearance of the Auckland waterfront further east. Next to the Lighter Basin a fish market and various warehouses were constructed, including Turners & Growers Ltd, the city's main produce wholesalers. The far side of the area was connected by a mechanical bridge that was able to be raised to allow passage into the basin to the fishing vessels which used it.

Timber mills had occupied the edges of Freeman's Bay prior to the construction of the Lighter Basin and Victoria Park; these continued to be a feature of the area for most of the 20th century along with other industries such as foundries, many of which were associated with ship building in one way or another.

For most of the 20th century, the harbour acted as the centre for much of the fishing industry in Auckland.

New quarter

In 1995, Russell Coutts and Team New Zealand won the America's Cup in San Diego. This led to Auckland hosting the 2000 America's Cup, and the viaduct was redeveloped to accommodate the America's Cup teams. After the competition, the area became a mixed-use zone of apartments and restaurants. A 2003 proposal to rename the Viaduct Harbour to 'Blake Harbour' (for Sir Peter Blake, a famous New Zealand yachtsman) was not successful. In 2011, the area of the Auckland waterfront to the west of the Viaduct Harbour, historically known as the Western Reclamation or Tank Farm, was redeveloped into Wynyard Quarter.

Gallery

See also

 Americas Cup
 Freemans Bay
 Princes Wharf

References

External links
The Viaduct (from theviaduct.co.nz, a local business association, includes photos of pre-redevelopment times)
The Viaduct (from theviaduct.com, another local business association)
Tourist reviews and images (from virtualtourist.com)
Photographs of Viaduct Basin held in Auckland Libraries' heritage collections.

Suburbs of Auckland
Tourist attractions in Auckland
Buildings and structures in Auckland
Auckland CBD
Auckland waterfront
Populated places around the Waitematā Harbour